Dr. Gary N. Ross is an energy economist, the Executive Chairman and Head of Global Oil for PIRA, an international energy analytics firm, where he oversees short-, medium-, and long-term oil market forecasts. He has guided PIRA Energy Group since its founding in 1976. He is globally known and respected by industry and government entities as an authority on worldwide energy markets and energy policy issues. He is a frequent speaker at industry seminars and conferences in the U.S. and abroad, covering a broad range of energy topics, and is a regular commentator on CNBC and CNN as well as the Financial Times and The New York Times. He is also a member of the Council on Foreign Relations.

Dr. Gary N. Ross has a PhD in economics from the City University of New York.

References

Energy economists
Living people
Graduate Center, CUNY alumni
Year of birth missing (living people)